The long-legged wood frog (Rana macrocnemis), also known as Caucasus frog, Brusa frog, or Uludağ frog, is a species of frog in the family Ranidae found in Armenia, Azerbaijan, Georgia, Iran, Russia, Turkey, and Turkmenistan.

Its natural habitats are boreal forests, temperate forests, temperate shrubland, subtropical or tropical dry shrubland, temperate grassland, rivers, intermittent rivers, swamps, freshwater lakes, intermittent freshwater lakes, freshwater marshes, intermittent freshwater marshes, freshwater springs, rocky areas, arable land, pastureland, plantations, rural gardens, urban areas, water storage areas, ponds, and introduced vegetation.
It is not considered threatened by the IUCN.

References

Rana (genus)
Amphibians of Azerbaijan
Taxonomy articles created by Polbot
Amphibians described in 1885